Assembly of the Guarani People – North Charagua (in Spanish: Asamblea del Pueblo Guarani - Charagua Norte), a progressive political grouping based amongst the Guarani people that contested the December 2004 municipal elections in Charagua, Santa Cruz Department, Bolivia. APG won two of the five council seats. In total it received 26,5% of the votes.

With the support of MNR and MAS (who hold one seat each in the council), Claudio Lopez Miguel of APG was elected mayor of the city. Lopez is the first Guarani to hold the office of mayor in Charagua.

See also
Eastern Bolivian Guaraní

External links
Article about the election at the Cipca website

Guaraní people
Indigenist political parties in South America
Indigenous organisations in Bolivia
Political parties in Bolivia
Political parties with year of establishment missing
Progressive parties in Bolivia